Anna Lundström (born 26 August 1980) is a Swedish former competitive figure skater. She is a two-time (1998 and 2002) Swedish national champion and a three-time Nordic medalist (one silver, two bronze). She reached the free skate at four ISU Championships – 1998 Junior Worlds in Saint John, New Brunswick, Canada; 1999 Junior Worlds in Zagreb, Croatia; 2000 Europeans in Vienna, Austria; and 2000 Worlds in Nice, France.

Programs

Results
JGP: Junior Series / Junior Grand Prix

References

 Figure skating corner profile

External links
 Tracings.net profile

Swedish female single skaters
Living people
1980 births
People from Karlskrona
Sportspeople from Blekinge County